Aglaopus pyrrhata is a species of moth of the family Thyrididae. It is found in most of mainland Australia.

The wingspan is about 30 mm.

The larvae feed on Eucalyptus species.

References

Thyrididae
Moths of Australia
Moths described in 1866
Taxa named by Francis Walker (entomologist)